Maksim Sidorov may refer to:
 Maksim Sidorov (shot putter) (born 1986), a Russian shot putter
 Maksim Sidorov (footballer, born 1991), Russian football player
 Maksim Sidorov (footballer, born 1998), Russian football player